The Gauliga Böhmen und Mähren, was the highest football league in the parts of Czechoslovakia occupied by Germany on 15 March 1939 and incorporated in the Protectorate of Bohemia and Moravia (German:Protectorat Böhmen und Mähren) from 1943 to 1945. The league only existed for one complete season.

Overview

After the German occupation the ethnically German clubs in the Protectorate initially entered the Gauliga Sudetenland. From 1943, a separate Gauliga Gauliga Böhmen und Mähren was formed by the NSRL.

The league was formed with fourteen clubs in two divisions. The two divisional champions then played a home-and-away final to determine the Gauliga champion. The winner of this competition qualified for the German championship. The clubs in the league were mostly military teams, only ethnically German clubs were permitted to take part in it. Czech clubs continued to play their own Bohemia/Moravia championship.

The league program was severely interrupted by the war and not all games were actually played in the 1943–44 season.

The imminent collapse of Nazi Germany in 1945 affected all Gauligas and its doubtful whether the 1944–45 season in the Gauliga Böhmen und Mähren got under way at all. The second season of the league was meant to operate with fifteen teams in three groups.

Aftermath
At the end of the Second World War, the German population of Czechoslovakia was almost completely expelled. Only a small minority remains in what is now the Czech Republic.

All German football clubs were dissolved and the Czechoslovak First League once more became the highest level of play for the whole country, but now without any ethnically German clubs, the last of which had been relegated in 1936 from the top division.

Winners and runners-up of the league
The winners and runners-up of the league:

References

Sources
 Die deutschen Gauligen 1933-45 - Heft 1-3  Tables of the Gauligas 1933–45, publisher: DSFS
 Kicker Almanach,  The yearbook on German football from Bundesliga to Oberliga, since 1937, published by the Kicker Sports Magazine

External links
  The Gauligas Das Deutsche Fussball Archiv 
 Germany - Championships 1902-1945 at RSSSF.com
 Where's My Country? Article on cross-border movements of football clubs, at RSSSF.com
 RSSSF.com - Czechoslovakia / Czech Republic - List of League Tables

Sudetenland
Sports leagues established in 1943
1945 disestablishments in Germany
Gauliga
Football leagues in Czechoslovakia
1943–44 in Czechoslovak football